Jacques de Larosière de Champfeu (born 12 November 1929) is a French former civil servant who served as the president of the European Bank for Reconstruction and Development from 1993 to 1998. He previously served as the governor of the Banque de France from 1987 to 1993. Before that appointment, he was also the sixth managing director of the International Monetary Fund (IMF) from 1978 to 1987

Family and education

Larosière descends from Joseph Thebaud. He studied at Lycée Louis-le-Grand and Institut d'Etudes Politiques de Paris. He graduated from École nationale d'administration in 1958 and entered the elite French Finance Ministry internal inspectorate known as the Inspection générale des finances.

Career

From 1965 to 1974 Larosière worked at the  within the French Finance Ministry. He then briefly joined the private office (cabinet) of Finance Minister Valéry Giscard d'Estaing, and following the latter election as French President, was appointed Director of the French Treasury in 1974, a position he held for the next four years. 

He was then the Managing Director of the International Monetary Fund (IMF) from 17 June 1978 to 15 January 1987. 

From 1987 to 1993 he was the Governor of the Banque de France. 

In September 1993 Larosière became President of the London-based European Bank for Reconstruction and Development, in the wake of the scandals that led to the departure of the EBRD's first president, Jacques Attali. He left this position in 1998 after restoring the bank's reputation and credibility. 

In the wake of the Bankruptcy of Lehman Brothers, European Commission President José Manuel Barroso asked Larosière to lead a high-level group that in February 2009 produced a landmark report, known as the "Larosière Report" and recommending a broad overhaul of the European Union financial regulatory architecture. The Larosiere Report's suggestions were adopted in EU legislation enacted in 2010 that created the European Banking Authority, the European Insurance and Occupational Pensions Authority, the European Securities and Markets Authority, and the European Systemic Risk Board. 

Policy advocacy

In 1992 Larosière became a member of the Washington-based Group of Thirty.

Honours 
 Grand Officer of the Legion of Honour
 Order of the Cross of Terra Mariana, 2nd Class
 Honorary Knight Commander of The Most Excellent Order of the British Empire

References 

 

1929 births
Living people
Lycée Louis-le-Grand alumni
Sciences Po alumni
École nationale d'administration alumni
Inspection générale des finances (France)
Governors of the Banque de France
Managing directors of the International Monetary Fund
BNP Paribas people
Recipients of the Order of the Cross of Terra Mariana, 2nd Class
Members of the Académie des sciences morales et politiques
Grand Officiers of the Légion d'honneur
Honorary Knights Commander of the Order of the British Empire
Presidents of the European Bank for Reconstruction and Development
French officials of the United Nations